Phoobsering Tea Estate is a tea garden in the Darjeeling Pulbazar in the Darjeeling Sadar subdivision of the Darjeeling district in the Indian state of West Bengal.

Geography

Etymology
The tea estate derives its name from a Sikkimese local 'Phurpu Tshering', Tshering  who was born on Thursday (Phurpu), it being a common practice to name Bhutia children after the day on which he/ she is born.
Some articles have also referred to Phurbu as a Lepcha, this may be due to his common share of genealogy with Chebu Lama.
O' Malleys  Gazetteer leads us to offer a fact that Phurbu Diwan was a brother of Cheebu Lama (Astrologer Lama). "Subsequently, on his death, this tract was leased jointly to Rechuk Dewan the son of CL, Pharbu Diwan, his brother and Raja Tenduk Pulger, his nephew and adopted son." 
A more recent detailed study on the topic "Flighty Subjects: Sovereignty, Shifting Cultivators, and the State in Darjeeling, 1830-1856" by Catherine Warner offer us insights into the genealogy of CL. In the article Campbell (Campbell 1869) acknowledges that CL's mother was a 'Lepcha' and his father a Bhutia (Tibeto-Sikkimese), in contrary to other claims that CL was a Lepcha (Hooker 1854;Risley 1894). "Since descent was often determined by the father’s side of the family (thus the Namgyals could marry Limbu and Lepcha wives, for example, without producing Limbu or Lepcha children), and Chebu Lama’s father was not, as mentioned, a Lepcha, he probably retained the option of identifying with Tibeto-Sikkimese circles"

R.K.Sprigg in his article titled '1826: The end of an era in the Social and political history of Sikkim' states that his "wife's grandfather, David Macdonald, claimed that the Cheeboo Lama's brother Phup (or Phurbu) Tshering (after whom one of Darjeeling's oldest tea-gardens is named) was his maternal grandfather".

The Tea Estate
It is one of the oldest plantations in the Darjeeling West valley. It is spread over 510 hectares of land. Phoobsering tea estate was established by the Darjeeling Tea Company in the 1856-1860 along with Ging, Takdah and Ambootia.

Phoobsering tea of Oolong variety is prized all over the world for its taste.

References
 
 http://www.chamong.com/phoobsering_tea_estate.html
 http://www.windhorsetours.com/sights/sight_details.php?pageid=28&placeid=307&country=india
L.S.S. O Malley
  Bengal District Gazetteer : Darjeeling. 

Tea estates in Darjeeling district